Fall Creek Falls is a  tall sheer-drop waterfall located in Fall Creek Falls State Park near Spencer, Tennessee. It is the tallest waterfall of such kind east of the Mississippi River (within the United States). A short trail leads from the parking lot atop the plateau down to the base of the gorge, giving access to the waterfall's plungepool. When water flow is sufficient, Coon Creek Falls shares a plungepool.

References

External links
 Map of Fall Creek Falls State Park (JPG)

Waterfalls of Tennessee
Waterfalls of Van Buren County, Tennessee